Borshchiv urban hromada is a hromada of Ukraine, in Chortkiv Raion of Ternopil Oblast. Its administrative center is Borshchiv. Population: 

Until 18 July 2020, the hromada belonged to Borshchiv Raion. The raion was abolished in July 2020 as part of the administrative reform of Ukraine, which reduced the number of raions of Ternopil Oblast to three. The area of Borshchiv Raion was merged into Chortkiv Raion.

Subdivisions and population
Borshchiv City Council
city Borshchiv
Babyntsi (Babińce)
Hlybochok (Głęboczek)
Hrabivtsi (Grabowce)
Khudiivtsi (Chudyjowce)
Konstanysiya (Konstancja)
Korolivka
Kozachchyna
Kryvche (Krzywcze)
Lanivtsi (Łanowce)
Mushkativka (Muszkatówka)
Ozeriany (Jezierzany)
Pylatkivtsi (Piłatkowce)
Pyshchatyntsi (Piszczatyńce)
Sapohiv (Sapohów)
Skov'yatyn (Skowiatyn)
Slobidka-Mushkativs'ka (Słobódka Muszkatowicka)
Strilkivtsi
Shuparka (Szuparka)
Shyshkivtsi (Szyszkowce)
Tulyn
Tsyhany (Cygany)
Verkhnyakivtsi (Wierzchniakowce)
Vovkivtsi (Wołkowce)
Vysichka (Wysuczka)
Zhylyntsi

External links
Berezhany city community. Gromada.info.

References

 
2016 establishments in Ukraine